The Prey of the Wind (French: La proie du vent) is a 1927 French silent drama film directed by  René Clair and starring  Charles Vanel, Sandra Milovanoff and Jean Murat.

The film's sets were designed by Lazare Meerson.

Cast
  Charles Vanel as Pierre Vignal
 Sandra Milovanoff as La femme folle
 Jean Murat as Le mari
 Lillian Hall-Davis as La châtelaine
 Jim Gérald  as Le docteur

References

Bibliography
 Celia McGerr. René Clair. Twayne Publishers, 1980.

External links
 

1927 films
Films directed by René Clair
French silent feature films
French drama films
1927 drama films
French black-and-white films
Silent drama films
1920s French films